A Deeper Cut is the third studio album by British rock band the Temperance Movement.

Track listing

Personnel
The Temperance Movement
 Phil Campbell – vocals
 Paul Sayer – guitars
 Nick Fyffe – bass
 Matt White – guitars
 Simon Lea – drums

Production
 The Temperance Movement — production
 Sam Miller — production, recording, mixing
 Geoff Pesche — mastering

Design
 Stewart Chown — design & layout

Charts

References

2018 albums
The Temperance Movement albums
Earache Records albums